Detective Training School (DTS) is maintained by Criminal Investigation Department (CID) of Bangladesh Police. It arranges various courses in the area of investigation and supervision. Since the inception this institute has produced a good number of highly professional investigating and detective officers. It is headed by a senior police officer in the rank of Additional DIG designated as the Commandant of this school. It was established on 25 July 1962.

Courses 
This school mainly provides training to –

References

Law enforcement in Bangladesh
Police academies in Bangladesh